The Bell 429 GlobalRanger is a light, twin-engine helicopter developed by Bell Helicopter and Korea Aerospace Industries. The first flight of the prototype took place on February 27, 2007, and the aircraft received type certification on July 1, 2009.  The Bell 429 is capable of single-pilot IFR and Runway Category A operations.

Development
The impetus for developing the Bell 429 came primarily from the emergency medical services (EMS) industry. The Bell 427 was originally intended to address this market, but the 427's small cabin size would not adequately accommodate a patient litter, and the systems did not support instrument flight rules (IFR) certification. Bell's original concept for the 429 was a stretched model 427 (unveiled as the Bell 427s3i at the 2004 HAI helicopter show), but this still did not provide what Bell and its customer advisers were looking for.

Bell abandoned the 427 airframe and went to its MAPL (Modular Affordable Product Line) concept airframe that was still in conceptual development at the time. The 429 employs the all-new modular airframe concept and the advanced rotor blade design from the MAPL program, but maintains a derivative engine and rotor drive system from the 427. The basic model includes a glass cockpit and is certified for single pilot IFR. Bell partnered with Korea Aerospace Industries and Mitsui Bussan Aerospace of Japan in the helicopter's development.

Bell had flown most of the critical MAPL technology components, using a 427 testbed aircraft, by February 2006. The first completed 429 flew on February 27, 2007. Certification was originally planned for late 2007, but program schedule delays, primarily caused by parts and material shortages common to all aviation manufacturers in that time period, caused the manufacturer to stretch the development timetable. In October 2007, the external configuration was set. In February 2008, Bell had three 429s in flight testing that had completed 600 flight hours.  Its high-altitude testing was conducted in Colorado and its high-temperature testing in Arizona.

The helicopter received type certification from Transport Canada Civil Aviation (TCCA) on July 1, 2009, and from the Federal Aviation Administration (FAA) by July 7, 2009. EASA certification was announced at Helitech on September 24, 2009. TCCA and authorities in some other countries later approved an increased weight exemption for the aircraft. However, FAA and EASA disagreed with the weight exemption, which had allowed the 429 to operate for the Canadian Coast Guard.

As of June 2009, the Bell 429 had received over 301 letters of intent. The launch customer was Air Methods Corporation, the largest medevac provider in the United States, which took one helicopter. On July 7, 2009, this aircraft (s/n 57006) was delivered to Air Methods (owner) and MercyOne (operator) at Bell's facility in Mirabel, Quebec.

Design

The Bell 429 has a four-blade rotor system with soft-in-plane flex beams. The rotor blades are composite and have swept tips for reduced noise. The tail rotor is made by stacking two two-blade rotors set at uneven intervals (to form an X) for reduced noise. The combined cabin volume is 204 cu ft (5.78 m3) with a  passenger cabin and  baggage area, with a flat floor for patient loading. A set of rear clamshell doors under the tailboom is optional for easier patient loading in EMS operations.

The 429 has a glass cockpit with a three-axis autopilot (optional fourth axis kit) and flight director as standard. Standard landing gear are skids. A retractable wheel landing gear is optional and adds five knots to cruising speed. The helicopter is categorized as a single-pilot IFR Category A. It is capable of operating with one engine inoperative. The main transmission is rated for 5,000 hours between overhauls and the tail rotor gearbox is rated for 3,200 hours.

Operational history
By July 2018, 325 aircraft had operated 330,000 hours for police forces, air medical teams, and militaries in 42 countries, including Australia, France, Indonesia, Kuwait, Oman, Switzerland, Slovakia, Sweden, Turkey, Thailand, the United States, and the United Kingdom.

Operators

Military and government operators

 Royal Australian Navy
723 Squadron RAN - 3

Canadian Coast Guard - 16

 Indonesian National Police
 - 2

 Jamaica Defence Force - 5

 New Zealand Police - 3

 Ministry of Defence - 5

Philippine National Police - 3 1 lost in crash in 2020

Slovak Police Force - 4 (one crashed)

Swedish Police Authority - 9 (7 ordered in 2014 and 2 in 2018)

 Royal Thai Police - 6

 
General Directorate of Security

Wiltshire Air Ambulance - 1

Delaware State Police - 4
Fairfax County Police Department - 2
New York City Police Department - 1
 Arizona Department of Public Safety - 1
Puerto Rico Department of Health - 1

 Tunisian National Guard - 3

Specifications (Bell 429)

See also

References

External links

 Bell Textron 429 official web page

2000s Canadian helicopters
2000s Canadian civil utility aircraft
429
Twin-turbine helicopters
Aircraft first flown in 2007